TSD may refer to:

Businesses and organizations
 TSD Desalination, an Israeli start-up
 Telluride School District R-1
 Texas School for the Deaf, U.S.
 Transylvanian Society of Dracula
 Turin School of Development, Italy
 University of Wales Trinity Saint David, a university in the U.K.

Government
 Technical Services Division, another term for the U.S. CIA's Office of Technical Service
 Treatment, Storage, and Disposal Facility; see HAZWOPER
 Treasury Solicitor's Department, U.K.
 Trilateral Security Dialogue, part of the Quadrilateral Security Dialogue
 Technical Support Division ad hoc Indian Army Intelligence Unit.

Science and medicine
 Target-to-skin distance, a measurement in external beam radiotherapy
 Tay–Sachs disease, a genetic disorder, fatal in its most common variant
 Temperature-dependent sex determination
 Thermionic specific detector, another term for nitrogen–phosphorus detector
 Total sleep deprivation, a parameter in sleep and memory studies

Other uses
 TSD (band), a 1990s girl band
 TSD rally (time-speed-distance), a type of motorsport rally
 ISO 639:tsd or Tsakonian, a modern Hellenic language which is highly divergent from other spoken varieties of Modern Greek
 .TSD file extension, for the graphics editor Tile Studio
 Tang Soo Do, a Korean martial art
 Text, Speech and Dialogue, an international conference held in the Czech Republic
 Toshiba Telecommunication Systems Division, Irvine, California
 Turtle saving device, another term for turtle excluder device